"A Chorus of Frogs" is the twenty-fourth episode of the second series of the 1960s cult British spy-fi television series The Avengers, starring Patrick Macnee and Julie Stevens. It was first broadcast by ABC on 9 March 1963. The episode was directed by Raymond Menmuir and written by Martin Woodhouse.

Plot
Steed takes a vacation to Greece. Whilst there he is asked to investigate the death of Greek deep-sea diver and smuggler, who was part of a group of part-time agents known as "the Frogs".

Music
Julie Stevens sings Hush, Little Baby and The Lips That Touch Kippers Burnaby & Long's  Parody of the Temperance song "The Lips That Touch Liquor".

Cast
 Patrick Macnee as John Steed
 Julie Stevens as Venus Smith
 Eric Pohlman as Archipelago Mason
 Yvonne Shima as Anna Lee
 Colette Wilde as Helena
 John Carson as Ariston Sondqvist
 Frank Gatliff as Dr. Pitt-Norton
 Michael Gover as One Six
 Alan Haywood as Jackson
 Makki Marseilles as Andreas Stephanopoulus 
 Norman Johns as Ship's 1st Officer

References

External links

Episode overview on The Avengers Forever! website

The Avengers (season 2) episodes
1963 British television episodes